Michael Joseph Buckley  (October 12, 1931 – July 25, 2019) was an American Jesuit priest and philosophical theologian. He was the Bea Professor of Theology at Santa Clara University. He also served as president of the Catholic Theological Society of America.

Buckley was born on October 12, 1931 in San Francisco, California, the son of Eleanor (née Fletcher) and colonel Michael Buckley Jr. He graduated from Bellarmine College Preparatory.

He studied philosophy at Gonzaga University, receiving a BA and MA. He graduated from Santa Clara University with a Master of Sacred Theology and received a PhD in 1967 from the University of Chicago, studying under Richard McKeon. He received two honorary doctorates. He died on July 25, 2019, in Los Gatos, California.

Publications
Motion and Motion's God: Thematic Variations in Aristotle, Cicero, Newton and Hegel (Princeton, 1971).
At the Origins of Modern Atheism (Yale, 1987).
Papal Primacy and the Episcopate: Towards a Relational Understanding (Herder, 1998).
The Catholic University as Promise and Project (Georgetown, 1998).
Denying and Disclosing God: The Ambiguous Progress of Modern Atheism (Yale, 2000).
What Do You Seek? The Questions of Jesus as Challenge and Promise (Eerdmans, 2016).

Activities
President, Catholic Theological Society of America, 1991–1992
Advisory Committee, Princeton Center of Theological Inquiry, 1999–2000
Chair, Jesuit International Theological Commission
Executive Director, Committees on Doctrine and Pastoral Research and Practices at the United States Conference of Catholic Bishops (USCCB)
Consultant Board Member, Herder/Crossroad Press
Member, Clare Hall, Cambridge University

References

1931 births
2019 deaths
20th-century American Jesuits
20th-century American Roman Catholic theologians
21st-century American Jesuits
21st-century American Roman Catholic theologians
Boston College faculty
Gonzaga University alumni
Santa Clara University alumni
Santa Clara University faculty
University of Chicago alumni
University of Notre Dame faculty
Presidents of the Catholic Theological Society of America
Bellarmine College Preparatory alumni